Madala Ooru or Madala Village is a small village in Dudda hobli, Mandya District, in Karnataka state in India. The village is in the Mandya Melokte Highway. Village is having population of 1200, most of them are kumbara or kulal community. Most of the people are Agriculture dependent. There are two famous temples Sri Kollapuradamma temple near Dodda kaluve and Sri Huchchappa temple in the Shivalli road. 

There is one famous Vermi culture unit Sri Lakshmi Venkateshwara Vermicompost in the village which provides Vermi compost to the local farmers

Villages in Mandya district